The Tatra 87 (T87) is a car built by Czechoslovak manufacturer Tatra. It is ranked among the fastest production cars of its time. Competing cars in this class, however, used engines with almost twice the displacement, and with fuel consumption of 20 liters per 100 km (11.8 mpg). Thanks to its aerodynamic shape, the Tatra 87 had a consumption of just 12.5 litres per 100 km (18.8 mpg). After the war between 1950 and 1953, T87s were fitted with more-modern 2.5-litre V8 T603 engines.

The 87 was used by Hanzelka and Zikmund for their travel through Africa and Latin America from 1947 to 1950.

Design
The Tatra 87 has unique bodywork. Its streamlined shape was designed by Hans Ledwinka and Erich Übelacker and was based on the Tatra 77, the first car designed with aerodynamics in mind. The body design was based on proposals submitted by Paul Jaray of Hungarian descent, who designed the famous German Graf Zeppelin dirigibles. A fin in the sloping rear of the Tatra helps to divide the air pressure on both sides of the car, a technique used later in aircraft. Tatra 87 had a drag coefficient of 0.36 as tested in the VW tunnel in 1979 as well as reading of 0.244 for a 1:5 model tested in 1941.

Small sets of windows in the dividers between the passenger, luggage space and engine compartments, plus louvres providing air for the air-cooled engine, allowed limited rear visibility. Its entire rear segment could be opened, to service the engine. The front doors are rear-hinged coach doors, sometimes termed "suicide doors", and the rear doors are front-hinged.

Many design elements of the Tatra 87, V570 and the later T97, were copied by later car manufacturers. Ferdinand Porsche was heavily influenced by the Tatra 87 and T97 and the flat-four-cylinder engine in his design of the Volkswagen Beetle, and was subsequently sued by Tatra.

The price new (in the 1940s) was 25,000 SFr. Its value today is around $125,000. A 1941 Tatra 87, owned and restored by Paul Greenstein and Dydia DeLyser of Los Angeles California, won a New York Times reader's poll of collector's cars in 2010, beating strong competition from 651 cars.

Notable owners
Streamlined Tatras
Tatra V570 1931, 1933
Tatra 77 1933-1938
Tatra 87 1936-1950
Tatra 97 1936-1939
Tatra 600 Tatraplan 1946-1952
Tatra 603 1956-1975
 Hans Ledwinka - the Tatra constructer (when pensioned he got one as a gift from Felix Wankel. This car is now on display in the Deutsches Museum in Munich)
 Eliška Junková - one of the greatest female drivers in Grand Prix motor racing history
 Ernst Heinkel - German Nazi aircraft designer, whose company produced the world's first turbojet aircraft and jet plane, as well as the first rocket aircraft
 Felix Wankel - German engineer, inventor of the Wankel engine
 Emil František Burian - Czech poet, journalist, singer, actor, musician, composer, dramatic adviser, playwright and director
 Vítězslav Nezval - one of the most prolific avant-garde Czech writers in the first half of the twentieth century and a co-founder of the Surrealist movement in Czechoslovakia
 Erwin Rommel - German General and Field Marshal of World War II (used also Tatra's Czech competitor, Škoda Superb, in the field)
 Andrey Yeryomenko - Soviet General and Field Marshal of World War II (received the first T87 manufactured after WW2 as a present, this car is now on display in the Tatra museum)
 John Steinbeck - American writer
 Farouk I of Egypt - the tenth ruler from the Muhammad Ali Dynasty and the penultimate King of Egypt and Sudan
 Josef Beran - Czech Cardinal of the Roman Catholic Church and Archbishop of Prague
 Edvard Beneš - a leader of the Czechoslovak independence movement, Minister of Foreign Affairs and the second President of Czechoslovakia
 Antonín Zápotocký, Klement Gottwald - communist leaders, presidents of Czechoslovakia after the 1948 coup d'état
 Jay Leno - an American stand-up comedian and television host
 Norman Foster - a British architect
The Tatra 87 was praised by German officers in World War II for the superior speed and handling it offered for use on the Autobahn. The Nazi armaments and munitions minister Fritz Todt declared: "This 87 is the Autobahn car ..." It was known, however, as the 'Czech secret weapon' because it killed so many Nazi officers during World War II that the German Army eventually forbade its officers from driving the Tatra. However, this alleged story has never been proven and is considered apocryphal, the order forbidding the T87 use being imposed only after several non-fatal accidents.

Literature
Margolius, Ivan & Henry, John G., Tatra - The Legacy of Hans Ledwinka, Veloce Publishing, Dorchester 2015,  &

References

External links 

Tatra 87 in 1947 Popular Science Magazine
Tatra Auto Klub Slovakia
Jay Leno's T87

87
Cars powered by rear-mounted 8-cylinder engines
1940s cars
1950s cars
Cars introduced in 1936
Automobiles with backbone chassis